Kai ( "and"; ; ; sometimes abbreviated k) is a letter that is a conjunction in Greek, Coptic and Esperanto (kaj).

Kai is the most frequent word in any Greek text and thus used by statisticians to assess authorship of ancient manuscripts based on the number of times it is used.

Ligature

Because of its frequent occurrence, kai is sometimes abbreviated in Greek manuscripts and in signage, by a ligature (comparable to Latin &), written as ϗ (uppercase variant Ϗ; Coptic variant ⳤ), formed from kappa (κ) with an extra lower stroke.
It may occur with the varia above it: ϗ̀.

Ϗ ϗ

For representation in electronic texts the kai symbol has its own Unicode positions: GREEK KAI SYMBOL (U+03D7) and GREEK CAPITAL KAI SYMBOL (U+03CF).

Authorship of ancient texts

The number of common words which express a general relation ("and", "in", "but", "I", "to be") is random with the same distribution at least among the same genre. By contrast, the occurrence of the definite article "the" cannot be modeled by simple probabilistic laws because the number of nouns with definite article depends on the subject matter.

Table 1 has data about the epistles of Saint Paul.  2nd Thessalonians, Titus, and Philemon were excluded because they were too short to give reliable samples. From an analysis of these and other data the first 4 epistles (Romans, 1 Corinthians, 2 Corinthians, and Galatians) form a consistent group, and all the other epistles lie more than 2 standard deviations from the mean of this group (using  statistics).

Esperanto
Esperanto  comes from Greek.

See also
Kaige revision, group of Greek-language Septuagint Bible versions that frequently use   ("and indeed").

References

 [Mor65] A. Q. Morton. The authorship of Greek prose (with discussion). Journal of the Royal Statistical Society, Series A, 128:169–233, 1965.

''This article incorporates material from Econ 7800 class notes by Hans G. Ehrbar, which is licensed under GFDL.

External links
Proposal to encode the uppercase letter in Unicode

Kai
Greek language
Punctuation
Typography
Greek letters